Natasha Khalila Dowie (born 30 June 1988) is an English footballer who plays as a striker for Women's Super League club Liverpool on loan from Reading. She represented the England women's national football team at the youth level before making her senior international debut in 2009. Dowie played for the London teams Watford, Fulham and Charlton Athletic, and then spent five years with Everton before transferring to FA WSL clubs Liverpool Ladies in November 2012 and Doncaster Rovers Belles in 2016. She also spent three periods on loan with Melbourne Victory of the Australian W-League in 2015, 2016, and 2017 and played for Boston Breakers in the National Women's Soccer League (NWSL) in 2016 and 2017.

Club career

Dowie attended Roundwood Park School and began her career with Watford Ladies. After starting the 2004–05 season with five goals in five matches for Watford, she was signed by Fulham Ladies. Dowie joined Charlton Athletic Ladies in the 2006 close season and played in the FA Women's Cup final that year, with Charlton losing 4–1 to Arsenal. When Charlton Athletic scrapped their women's team in the 2007 close season,

Everton 

Dowie joined Everton Ladies in preference to several other interested clubs including Arsenal. She stated her intention to "knock Arsenal off their pedestal in women's football".

While commuting from London to Liverpool, Dowie was a member of Everton's League Cup winning side in her first season with the club. On 3 May 2010 she scored two goals, including the 119th minute extra-time winner, to give Everton a 3–2 victory over Arsenal in the 2010 FA Women's Cup Final.

With Everton dormant ahead of the 2011 FA WSL season, Dowie played for Barnet in the 2010–11 FA Women's Premier League National Division. She continued to play for Everton in European competition and netted in The Blues' UEFA Women's Champions League quarter–final defeat to FCR 2001 Duisburg. Dowie then scored two goals for Everton in their first FA WSL match, including a stoppage-time equaliser, to rescue a 3–3 draw at local rivals Liverpool.

Liverpool 
In November 2012 Dowie and Fara Williams left Everton for ambitious local rivals Liverpool, who were building a squad to challenge Arsenal's dominance of English women's football.

Dowie finished the top scorer in the 2013 FA WSL with 13 goals in 14 games for champions Liverpool. She was voted the FA Players' Player of the Year and selected in the Professional Footballers' Association (PFA) Team of the Year.

Liverpool retained their title in 2014, but were much less successful in 2015. They finished seventh of eight teams amidst an injury crisis and coach Matt Beard departed for American National Women's Soccer League (NWSL) club Boston Breakers. Dowie agreed a two-month loan to Australian W-League club Melbourne Victory in November 2015.

Doncaster Rovers 
Upon her return she transferred to newly promoted Doncaster Rovers Belles. Doncaster lost their four opening games and were marooned at the foot of the WSL 1 table, when Dowie left the club by "mutual consent" in the mid-season break.

Boston Breakers 
On 17 July 2016, Boston Breakers announced her signing. Dowie finished the 2017 season as the top goal-scorer for the Breakers with 7 goals. She also wore the captain's arm band for the Breakers in matches on 23 and 30 September 2017 when Julie King was out with an injury. When Boston Breakers folded in January 2018, Dowie was not selected in the 2018 NWSL Dispersal Draft which was hastily arranged to assign displaced Breakers players to other NWSL clubs.

Linköpings 

In January 2018, Dowie agreed to join Swedish Damallsvenskan champions Linköpings FC, on an initial six-month contract. On 26 June, it was confirmed that Dowie would be leaving Linköpings after her 6-month contract expired, as they were unable to agree on a long-term contract.

Melbourne Victory 
Dowie rejoined Melbourne Victory for a fourth time in September 2018, signing a two-year permanent deal. She played 24 leagues matches and scored 16 goals during her two year period in the process helping the club to win the 2018–19 W-League Premiership. She was loaned to Vålerenga of the Toppserien in March 2019.

On 28 June 2021, Reading announced the signing of Dowie.

International career

Dowie was called into an England training camp while still a year ten pupil at Roundwood Park School. She has since represented England at Under-17, 19, 20 and 23 levels, playing in the FIFA Under-20's World Cup Finals in Chile in November 2008. She was included in coach Hope Powell's squad for the pre-Euro 2009 friendlies against Iceland and Denmark, but did not play and was left out of the final Euro 2009 squad.

She finally made her debut in a World Cup qualifier against Turkey in İzmir on 26 November 2009. Dowie was an 84th-minute substitute for Everton Ladies teammate Jody Handley. Six months later she won another cap as a substitute in a 6–0 win over Malta. Dowie remained on the fringes of the squad and her next appearance was not until September 2011. She was substituted at half time in a 2–2 draw with lowly Serbia.

Dowie was not selected for the 2011 FIFA Women's World Cup, for the Great Britain squad at the 2012 London Olympics, or for UEFA Women's Euro 2013. Her exclusion from the latter tournament was controversial as she was the WSL's leading goalscorer at the time.

When Hope Powell was sacked after England's Euro 2013 failure, interim coach Brent Hills immediately recalled Dowie. She came on as a substitute in England's first 2015 FIFA World Cup qualifier and scored her first national team goal in a 6–0 win over Belarus at Dean Court in Bournemouth. Dowie's continuing good form at club level meant it was something of a surprise when she was left out of England's 2015 FIFA Women's World Cup squad. Almost two years after her last cap in September 2014, she remained keen to play for England and hoped to win a recall from Hope Powell's successor Mark Sampson.

Career statistics

Club

International goals

Scores and results list England's goal tally first.

Coaching career
Dowie has a Uefa B FA Football coaching qualification and has worked as a coach with Watford, the Middlesex Centre of Excellence and Stevenage Borough.
Dowie is soon to begin coaching with ESAF – Elite Schools Academy of Football.

Personal life
Dowie is the daughter of Bob Dowie and the niece of former Northern Ireland international footballer, Iain Dowie. Her paternal grandfather was born in Belfast. She was a player with Charlton Ladies whilst her uncle managed the men's side. Natasha's 2010 FA Women's Cup final goals against Arsenal Ladies came two hours after Hull City, managed by uncle Iain, were relegated from the Premier League. On 26 May 2016, she married former teammate Becky Easton.

Honours
Everton
 Women's FA Cup: 2009–10
 FA Women's National League Cup: 2007–08

Liverpool
 FA Women's Super League (2): 2013, 2014

Melbourne Victory
 W-League Premiership: 2018–19

Individual
 FA Women's Players' Player of the Year: 2013
 FA Women's Super League Top Scorer: 2013
 FA Women's Super League PFA Team of the Year: 2013–14
 FA Women's Super League Goal of the Month: January 2022
 FA Women's Cup Final Player of the Match: 2010
 W-League Golden Boot: 2018–19
 W-League Player of the Month: November 2016
 Liverpool Supporters' Player of the Year: 2015
 Liverpool Goal of the Season: 2015 (v. Sunderland)
 Everton Player of the Year: 2011

References

External links

 
 
 
 
 
 

1988 births
Living people
English women's footballers
Watford F.C. Women players
Fulham L.F.C. players
Charlton Athletic W.F.C. players
Everton F.C. (women) players
Barnet F.C. Ladies players
Liverpool F.C. Women players
Melbourne Victory FC (A-League Women) players
Doncaster Rovers Belles L.F.C. players
Boston Breakers players
FA Women's National League players
Women's Super League players
A-League Women players
National Women's Soccer League players
England women's international footballers
England women's under-23 international footballers
People from Abu Dhabi
People educated at Roundwood Park School
English expatriate women's footballers
English expatriate sportspeople in Australia
Expatriate women's soccer players in Australia
Expatriate women's soccer players in the United States
Expatriate women's footballers in Sweden
Expatriate women's footballers in Norway
English expatriate sportspeople in the United States
English expatriate sportspeople in Sweden
English expatriate sportspeople in Norway
Lesbian sportswomen
English LGBT sportspeople
LGBT association football players
Linköpings FC players
Damallsvenskan players
Vålerenga Fotball Damer players
Women's association football forwards
Toppserien players
English people of Northern Ireland descent
Expatriate women's footballers in Italy
English expatriate sportspeople in Italy
A.C. Milan Women players
Serie A (women's football) players